Rauma is a town and municipality of around  inhabitants on the west coast of Finland,  north of Turku, and  south of Pori. Its neighbouring municipalities are Eura, Eurajoki, Laitila and Pyhäranta. Granted town privileges on 17 April 1442 (then under the rule of Sweden), Rauma is known for its paper and maritime industry, high quality lace (since the 18th century) and the old wooden architecture of the city centre (Old Rauma, Vanha Rauma), which is a UNESCO World Heritage site.

History
In the 14th century, before it was declared a town, Rauma had a Franciscan monastery and a Catholic church. In 1550, the townsmen of Rauma were ordered to relocate to Helsinki, but this was unsuccessful and Rauma continued to grow.

Practically the whole wooden part of the town of Rauma was devastated in the fires of 1640 and 1682. The city centre, which was as large as the town was until 1809, has approximately 600 wooden buildings. The neo-renaissance style of many of the houses is a result of prosperity brought on by seafaring. In 1897 Rauma had the largest fleet of sailing boats in Finland, totalling 57 vessels. As the Crimean War broke out in 1853, Rauma was attacked by French Navy and British Navy in 1855 during the Åland War. Goods were mainly exported to Germany, Stockholm and the Baltic states. In the 1890s, Rauma got a teacher's college (a 'seminar'), which was later annexed to the University of Turku. A part of the department of education still exists in Rauma.

The name Rauma comes from the Germanic word strauma, meaning "stream".

Geography

Neighborhoods and suburbs
Neighborhoods and suburbs of Rauma include:

 Tarvonsaari
 Merirauma
 Uusi-Lahti
 Kappelinluhta
 Paloahde
 Haapasaari
 Syvärauma
 Kinno
 Kaaro
 Luostarinkylä
 Impivaara
 Äyhö
 Uotila
 Lajo
 Nikulanmäki
 Lensunkallio
 Nummi
 Pyynpää
 Otanlahti
 Pidesluoto
 Komppi
 Lonsi
 Polari
 Sampaanala
 Paroalho
 Kourujärvi
 Kortela
 Monna
 Kourujärvi
 Kodisjoki
 Lappi

Climate

Rauma has a humid continental climate with cold winters and warm summers. The marine affect from the Gulf of Bothnia brings both warmth in the winter and cooler temperatures in the summer. And similar to other coastal cities of Finland in the south, the average annual temperature in Rauma is about 6 °C (42.8 °F). On February 3 1966, the lowest ever recorded temperature in central Rauma hit -33.6 °C (-28.5 °F), and the highest temperature record being around 33 °C (91.4 °F) with no clear data, due to the weather station's data having been taken into use only in late 2010's.

Economy
After World War II, Rauma developed into an industrial city, the main industries being shipbuilding, paper and pulp mills, and metal industry. Rauma is also the fifth largest port in Finland with almost six million tonnes of shipping per year. Olkiluoto Nuclear Power Plant is located next to Rauma, in Eurajoki.
Near Rauma, there is the static-inverter plant of Fenno-Skan.

In 2019 the biggest tax payers in Rauma were Raumaster, Forchem, Länsi-Suomen Osuuspankki, Oras, Alfa Laval Aalborg and LähiTapiola Lännen.

Demographics

Transport

Rauma is located between Turku and Pori by the national road 8 (E8). Finnish national road 12 starts from Rauma and it was extended to the Port of Rauma in 2008.

A railway connection from Kokemäki is in active freight use, as there is a straight connection to the heavy industry areas and to the port of Rauma. The rail passenger traffic ended in 1988.

Satakunnan Liikenne Oy runs the local bus traffic and it has 3 lines in Rauma. The hub for the local buses is located in Savila while the Long distance buses operate from Rauma bus station. The long distance buses take passengers directly to Pori and Turku and to Tampere and Helsinki with one transfer at Huittinen.

The nearest airport is located in Pori. The port of Rauma serves only freight ships on frequent basis.

Culture
Rauma has its own dialect of Finnish, "Rauman giäl". The dialect inherits words from languages such as Swedish, English and German due to the seafaring past. The dialect has been diluted into mainstream Finnish in day-to-day use, but it is fairly well studied (mainly by Hj. Nortamo) and practiced as a hobby.

The town also is the birthplace of Raumism, the non-idealist view of the constructed language Esperanto as a vehicle for culture, rather than as an international auxiliary language.

Rauma Maritime Museum in the Rauma Nautical School building was founded in 1999.

Lace Week
Annual Lace Week has been arranged in Rauma since year 1971. During the Lace week local craftspeople arrange small exhibitions in the Old Rauma area. The Lace week culminates to the Black Lace Night, when the small boutiques are open late night, various shows and concerts are held and people dress in black lace.

Other events
Music festival RMJ, held in Pori in 2008 and 2009.
Classical music festival Festivo
Jazz-happening Rauma Summer Jazz
Creative and performing music arts festival Klustermus
Movie festival Blue Sea Film Festival
Blues festival Rauma Blues

Sports
Rauman Lukko is the local ice hockey team. Founded in 1936, Lukko plays in Liiga, the top professional league in Finland. Lukko has won the Finnish championship twice, in 1963 and 2021. Their home arena is Äijänsuo Arena. Local football teams are Pallo-Iirot and FC Rauma. These two teams share the same home field at Äijänsuo sports centre.
Sea City Storm is an American football team playing in the Finnish American Football Association's 2nd division. Fera is a women's Finnish baseball team, whose home field is the Länsi-Suomi Arena at Otanlahti sports centre.
Rauma also has an own orienteering club, Rasti-Lukko, two basketball teams known as Kaaron Roima and Rauma Basket, a rinkball team called UKP and a floorball team named SalBa.

Recreation

One popular saying goes that every family in Rauma owns a boat – this is not true, though the city has room for ca. 2,800 boats at its docks. People can use their own boats or water buses to get to the Kylmäpihlaja Lighthouse that doubles as a hotel and recreation site. Water buses take people to Reksaari island and former garrison island of Kuuskajaskari. Both islands are in recreational use.

Consolidation of municipalities
Rauma and the surrounding municipality of Rauman maalaiskunta ("rural municipality of Rauma") were consolidated in 1993, continued in 2007 with the consolidation of municipality of Kodisjoki. The municipality of Lappi was consolidated to Rauma in 2009.

International relations

Twin towns — Sister cities
Rauma is twinned with the following cities and towns:

Notable people
Sebastian Aho, professional ice hockey player
Antti Raanta, professional ice hockey goaltender
Timo Soini, former Finnish foreign minister

See also 
Rauma dialect

References

External links 

 
Town of Rauma – Official site
Länsi-Suomi – The city's most widely read newspaper
Raumalainen – Local biweekly free newspaper (formerly Uusi Rauma), makes also a publication in local dialect once a year.
Radio Ramona - Local radio station
Rauma collection in 3D Warehouse 

 
Cities and towns in Finland
Populated coastal places in Finland
Grand Duchy of Finland
Medieval Finnish towns
Port cities and towns in Finland
Port cities and towns of the Baltic Sea
Populated places established in the 1440s
1440s establishments in Europe